Six Scary Stories is a horror anthology edited by Stephen King published by Cemetery Dance Publications on August 25, 2016. A hardcover edition followed on October 31.

Conception

The stories were selected by King from those submitted in a contest he judged, sponsored by The Guardian and Hodder & Stoughton.

Stories

 "Wild Swimming" by Elodie Harper
 "Eau-de-Eric" by Manuela Saragosa
 "The Spots" by Paul Bassett Davies
 "The Unpicking" by Michael Button
 "La Mort de L'amont"  by Stuart Johnstone
 "The Bear Trap" by Neil Hudson

References

2016 anthologies
Horror anthologies
Cemetery Dance Publications books